"Take This Time" is a song by English actor and singer Sean Maguire, released as his second single in October 1994. It reached number 27 on the UK Singles Chart.

Track listings
CD1
 "Take This Time"
 "Take This Time" (Arty Mango mix)
 "Take This Time" (Ragga mix)
 Andy Peters Speaks to Sean – Part 1

CD2
 "Take This Time"
 "Take This Time" (Arty Mango mix)
 "Take This Time" (La Smoov re-mix)
 Andy Peters Speaks to Sean – Part 2

References 

1994 singles
1994 songs
Parlophone singles
Sean Maguire songs